Amir Khan vs. Marcos Maidana was a boxing match held on December 11, 2010. The bout was for Khan's WBA Light Welterweight Title, which Khan successfully defended, winning via unanimous decision. The bout was awarded Fight of the Year by the Boxing Writers Association of America.

Build-up 
On 9 March 2010, Golden Boy Promotions confirmed that WBA light welterweight champion Amir Khan and former light welterweight world champion Paulie Malignaggi will hold a press conference in London to announce their world title bout set for 15 May at the Madison Square Garden in New York. This was Khan's first bout in the U.S. The fight was for the WBA light welterweight title, which Khan won in the 11th round. Immediately after the fight, Khan stated he wanted to fight Marcos Maidana next and unify the light-welterweight division, suggesting that the way to do this would be for him to fight Maidana, and then go on to face the winner of a Devon Alexander vs. Timothy Bradley match.

Maidana, after failing to challenge undefeated WBO Junior Welterweight champion Timothy Bradley, postponed the fight to June 19 due to a back injury suffered by Maidana.

On May 3, Maidana pulled out of the fight yet again, still citing his back as the problem. The fight had already been rescheduled from June 19 to July 17, and Bradley went on to fight Luis Carlos Abregu on July 17, instead of Maidana.

After failing to secure the fight with Bradley, Maidana's camp announced that he would fight former-WBO junior welterweight champ DeMarcus Corley, on August 28, 2010 at the Luna Park Stadium in Buenos Aires, Argentina. Maidana went on to go and win by unanimous decision.

Khan was looking for a good opponent to next challenge him for his title. One of his possible opponents was Lightweight Champion Juan Manuel Marquez. Marquez decided not to move up in weight and stayed at lightweight.

Maidana then stated his intention to fight Khan: "Stop looking for possible opponents for next Khan December 11 in England. Stop looking for lightweight boxers and face the real 140-pounders. I'll go to Khan's home soil to take the other portion of the WBA title that belongs to me."

The fight
The HBO-televised fight took place at Mandalay Bay in Las Vegas.

Khan successfully defended his title for the third time against WBA Interim Champion and mandatory challenger, Marcos Maidana on 11 December 2010 in Las Vegas. Khan dominated the fight early and knocked down Maidana in the 1st round with multiple body shots. However, Maidana recovered and battered Khan with a furious barrage in the tenth, sending him wobbling toward the ropes. Khan was able to improve in Round 11 and Maidana had another good round in the 12th, as Maidana was able to secure the last 3 rounds of the fight, making it very competitive on the judges' scorecards. However, Khan was able to stay on his feet as the vicious punches by Maidana were not enough to secure a knockout. Khan won the fight by unanimous decision on the strength of his performance in the earlier rounds as well as a point deduction against Maidana for throwing an elbow in the fifth.

Fight purses
Guaranteed fight purses:
Amir Khan ($1,500,000) vs. Marcos Maidana ($550,000)
Victor Ortiz ($150,000) vs. Lamont Peterson ($100,000)

Fight card

Televised
Light Welterweight Championship bout:  Amir Khan(c)  vs.  Marcos Maidana
Khan defeats Maidana via unanimous decision.
Light Welterweight bout:  Victor Ortiz vs.  Lamont Peterson
Fight ended in a draw.

Untelevised
Welterweight bout:  Joan Guzman vs.  Jason Davis
Guzman defeats Davis via TKO at 0:29 of round 2.
Heavyweightbout:  Seth Mitchell vs.  Taurus Sykes
Mitchell defeats Sykes via KO of round 5.
Lightweight bout:  Sharif Bogere vs.  Christopher Fernandez
Bogere defeats Fernandez via unanimous decision.
Light Welterweight bout:  Jesse Vargas vs.  Ramón Montaño
Vargas defeats Montaño via unanimous decision.
Featherweight bout:  Randy Caballero vs.  Robert Guillen
Caballero defeats Guillen via unanimous decision.
Middleweight bout:  Alfonso Blanco vs.  Gustavo Medina
Blanco defeats Medina via TKO at 2:45 of round 3.
Light Welterweight bout:  Jamie Kavanagh vs.  Jacob Thornton
Kavanagh defeats Thornton via TKO at 0:44 of round 1.

Viewership and revenue
On HBO, the fight drew an audience of 1.17million viewers in the United States. On Sky Box Office, the fight sold  pay-per-view buys in the United Kingdom. The fight had a combined HBO and Sky Box Office audience of million viewers.

The fight grossed $500,000 at the live gate. On Sky Box Office, at a price of £14.95 ($), pay-per-view revenue was £ ($). The fight had a combined US live-gate and UK pay-per-view revenue of $.

Reception
The bout was awarded Fight of the Year by the Boxing Writers Association of America. It was called one of the 'fights of the decade' by Oscar De La Hoya.

In 2018, Joe Cortez, the fight's referee and veteran International Boxing Hall of Fame member, called the bout "one of the most outstanding, skillful and exciting" championship fights that he refereed throughout his career in the sport.

International broadcasting

References

External links
Khan vs. Maidana Official Fight Card from BoxRec

Boxing matches
2010 in boxing
Boxing in Las Vegas
2010 in sports in Nevada
History of boxing
Golden Boy Promotions
Amir Khan (boxer)
December 2010 sports events in the United States